Brodiaea stellaris is a species of flowering plant in the cluster-lily genus known by the common name starflower brodiaea.

The bulb  is endemic to northern California, where it grows on the serpentine soils of the North California Coast Ranges. Flowering peaks in May

Description
Brodiaea stellaris is a perennial that produces a short inflorescence only a few centimeters tall which bears flowers on pedicels. Each flower has six blue-purple tepals up to 1.5 centimeters long. At the center of the flower are large white sterile stamens called staminodes which surround the distinctive forked fertile stamens.

References

External links
Jepson Manual Treatment
USDA Plants Profile
Flora of North America
Photo gallery

stellaris
Endemic flora of California
Natural history of the California Coast Ranges